Stenomelania is a genus of freshwater snails with a gill and an operculum, aquatic gastropod mollusks in the subfamily Thiarinae of the family Thiaridae known as thiarids.

Species 
Species within the genus Stenomelania include:
 Stenomelania acutospira (I. Lea, 1850)
 Stenomelania amabilis (G. von dem Busch)
 Stenomelania aspirans (Hinds, 1844) - type species of the genus Stenomelania
 Stenomelania blatta (I. Lea, 1850)
 Stenomelania boninensis (I. Lea, 1856)
 Stenomelania brenchleyi (Baird, 1873)
 Stenomelania clavus  (J.B.P.A. Lamarck, 1822)
 Stenomelania coarctata  (J.B.P.A. Lamarck, 1822)
 Stenomelania costellaris (I. Lea & H. C. Lea, 1851)
 Stenomelania crenulata (Deshayes, 1838) - synonym: Stenomelania rufescens (Martens, 1860)
 Stenomelania denisoniensis (Brot, 1877)
 Stenomelania distinguenda  (A. Brot)
 † Stenomelania dollfusi (Jodot, 1928) 
 Stenomelania erosa (Lesson, 1831)
 Stenomelania graeffei (A. Mousson)
 |Stenomelania iaxa (A. Mousson)
 Stenomelania juncea (I. Lea & H. C. Lea, 1851)
 Stenomelania lancea (I. Lea, 1850)
 Stenomelania litigiosa (A. Brot, 1877)
 Stenomelania loebbeckii (A. Brot, 1877)
 Stenomelania luctuosa (Hinds, 1844)
 Stenomelania lutosa (A. Gould, 1847)
 Stenomelania macilenta (Menke, 1830)
 Stenomelania mucronata (von dem Busch, 1853)
 Stenomelania persulcata (Mousson, 1869)
 Stenomelania plicaria I. von Born, 1778
 Stenomelania punctata (Lamarck, 1822)
 Stenomelania rustica (Mousson, 1857)
 Stenomelania torulosa (Bruguière, 1789) - synonym: Bulimus torulosus Bruguière, 1789
 Stenomelania uniformis Quoy & Gaimard, 1834
 Stenomelania waigiensis (Lesson, 1831)

Synonyms:
 Stenomelania arthurii (Brot, 1870): synonym of Stenomelania persulcata'' (Mousson, 1869) (junior synonym)
 Stenomelania funiculus (Quoy & Gaimard, 1834): synonym of Stenomelania plicaria (Born, 1778)
 Stenomelania hastula (I. Lea, 1850): synonym of Stenomelania plicaria (Born, 1778)
 Stenomelania housei Lea, 1856 is a synonym of Sulcospira housei (Lea, 1856)
 Stenomelania rufescens (Martens, 1860): synonym of Stenomelania crenulata (Deshayes, 1838)
 Stenomelania semicancellata (von dem Busch, 1844): synonym of Stenomelania torulosa'' (Bruguière, 1789) (junior subjective synonym)

References

External links
  Glaubrecht M., Brinkmann N. & Pöppe J. (2009). Diversity and disparity ‘down under': Systematics, biogeography and reproductive modes of the ‘marsupial' freshwater Thiaridae (Caenogastropoda, Cerithioidea) in Australia. Zoosystematics and Evolution. 85(2): 199-275

Thiaridae